National Tertiary Route 804, or just Route 804 (or ) is a National Road Route of Costa Rica, located in the Limón province.

Description
In Limón province the route covers Siquirres canton (Pacuarito district), Matina canton (Batán district).

References

Highways in Costa Rica